Mount Macaulay is a mountain peak in Canada, located in Kluane National Park and Reserve in Yukon.

See also

List of mountain peaks of North America
List of mountain peaks of Canada

References

External links

Macaulay
Macaulay
Kluane National Park and Reserve